Sandal Magna or Sandal is a suburb of Wakefield, West Yorkshire, England with a population in 2001 of 5,432. An ancient settlement, it is the site of Sandal Castle and is mentioned in the Domesday Book.
The Battle of Wakefield was fought here in the 15th century during the Wars of the Roses.

History

Toponymy

Early history
The church was on the site of the present church of St Helen.

William de Warenne, 2nd Earl of Surrey (1081–1138) was granted the Sandal estates in 1107 and began the building of Sandal Castle which became the baronial seat of the lords of the manor of Wakefield.

During the Wars of the Roses, the Duke of York was killed on 30 December 1460 in the Battle of Wakefield fought between Sandal Castle and St Helen′s Church.

There are records of mining for coal and quarrying for stone in the 14th century.

The highwayman John Nevison was arrested on 6 March 1684 at the Three Houses Inn and tried for the murder of Darcy Fletcher, a constable who had tried to arrest him near Howley Hall at Soothill in Batley.

Geography

The main road through Sandal is the A61 Wakefield-to-Barnsley road.

Location grid

Governance
Sandal was anciently a parish town in the Agbrigg Division of the wapentake of Agbrigg and Morley in the liberty of Wakefield, West Riding of Yorkshire. Following the Poor Law Amendment Act of 1834, Sandal Magna became one of the 17 constituent parishes of the Wakefield Poor Law Union formed in 1837.

Religion
Sandal Magna's church is dedicated to St. Helen, the mother of Constantine the Great. At the time of the Norman Conquest Sandal Church was a possession of the crown. The Saxon church was recorded as one of two churches in the Wakefield manor in the Domesday Book of 1086.

In about 1150 the first church was replaced by a second church in the shape of a Latin cross by Earl Warenne of Sandal Castle. It was enlarged in about 1180 and almost completely rebuilt in the first half of the 14th century. The church was altered and extended after 1505 and the present church extensively restored and enlarged in 1872.

Transportation
The Sandal and Agbrigg railway station on the Wakefield line (part of the West Yorkshire Metro) with services operated by Northern is at the north-east side of the neighbourhood and serves Sandal and the adjacent suburb of Agbrigg.

Amenities
Largely a residential area, its amenities include a library, schools, the Anglican church of St Helen, a Methodist church and an Asda supermarket.

References

Notes

Bibliography

Suburbs of Wakefield